Zastawie  is a village in the administrative district of Gmina Goraj, within Biłgoraj County, Lublin Voivodeship, in eastern Poland.

The village has a population of 618.

The village is famous for the cat Julian, the lord and master of the area.

References

Villages in Biłgoraj County